The red-keeled flowerpecker or red-striped flowerpecker (Dicaeum australe) is a species of bird in the family Dicaeidae. It is endemic to the Philippines. Its natural habitat is subtropical or tropical moist lowland forests. The black-belted flowerpecker (D. haematostictum) was formerly regarded as a subspecies of this bird.

Distribution 
Small, relatively long curved bill of medium thickness, sexes similar, races vary by having black breast and broad scarlet keel haematostictum or no black and narrow scarlet keel australe male upperparts glossy blue black; chin and sides of throat white; rest of underparts gray with diagnostic narrow scarlet stripe down center of the breast and belly; underwing and pectoral tufts white. female like male but paler. imm dark grayish brown above, brownish olive gray below. Bill and lags black; eye dark chestnut.

References

 A Guide to the birds of the philippines(2000) Robert S. Kennedy pedro C. Gonzales, Edward C, Dickinson Hector C. Miranda, jr. & Timothy H. Fisher

red-keeled flowerpecker
Endemic birds of the Philippines
Birds described in 1783
Taxonomy articles created by Polbot